KVLF is a radio station at 1240 AM in Alpine, Texas. It is owned by Alpine Radio, LLC.

History
KVLF received its license in 1947. It was owned by Big Bend Broadcasting and broadcast on 1490 kHz until 1948. In 1958, Gene Hendryx bought KVLF from Jack W. Hawkins and Barney W. Hubbs; the station increased its daytime power to 1,000 watts in 1960 and its nighttime power to the same in 1997.

In 2015, Gene R. Hendryx Jr., sold KVLF to the Benevich family doing business as Alpine Radio, LLC.

References

External links

FCC History Cards for KVLF

VLF
Radio stations established in 1947
1947 establishments in Texas